Ioan Florariu (born 13 January 1979 in Bucecea) is a Romanian rower.

References 
 

1979 births
Living people
Romanian male rowers
World Rowing Championships medalists for Romania
People from Botoșani County
21st-century Romanian people